Chaturan Sanjeewa (born 6 June 1980) is a Sri Lankan former cricketer who played in 32 first-class and 17 List A matches between 1996 and 2007. He made his Twenty20 debut on 17 August 2004, for Sri Lanka Air Force Sports Club in the 2004 SLC Twenty20 Tournament. He is now an umpire, and has stood in matches in the 2018–19 Premier Limited Overs Tournament.

References

External links
 

1980 births
Living people
Sri Lankan cricketers
Sri Lankan cricket umpires
Singha Sports Club cricketers
Sri Lanka Air Force Sports Club cricketers
Place of birth missing (living people)